West Anglia may refer to:

 The College of West Anglia, further education college
 The medieval kingdom of Mercia, as the westernmost part of England settled by the Angles
 The West Anglia Main Line (WAML), railway line
 West Anglia Great Northern, a former WAML franchise operator

See also
 Anglia (disambiguation)
 East Anglia
 Mid Anglia (disambiguation)